The 1934 Montana State Bobcats football team was an American football team that represented Montana State College (later renamed Montana State University) as a member of the Rocky Mountain Conference (RMC) during the 1934 college football season. In their seventh season under head coach Schubert R. Dyche, the Bobcats compiled a 2–5 record (0–4 against RMC opponents), finished in last place out of 12 teams in the RMC, and were outscored by a total of 95 to 38.

Schedule

References

Montana State
Montana State Bobcats football seasons
Montana State Bobcats football